The Central District of Razan County is a district (bakhsh) in Razan County, Hamadan Province, Iran. At the 2006 census, its population was 32,549, in 7,789 families.  The District has one city: Razan.  The District has two rural districts (dehestan): Kharqan Rural District and Razan Rural District.

References 

Razan County
Districts of Hamadan Province